Rudna Mała may refer to the following places in Poland:
Rudna Mała, Lower Silesian Voivodeship (south-west Poland)
Rudna Mała, Subcarpathian Voivodeship (south-east Poland)